The 1989 Dutch TT was the ninth round of the 1989 Grand Prix motorcycle racing season. It took place on the weekend of 22–24 June 1989 at the TT Circuit Assen located in Assen, Netherlands.

500 cc race report
Wayne Gardner is back for the first time since the Laguna crash that broke his leg. Kevin Schwantz gets 5 poles in a row, with Wayne Rainey second on the line. Green light and it's Schwantz, Rainey, Pierfrancesco Chili and Eddie Lawson at the front.

Down the field, Gardner get past Mick Doohan, while Schwantz begins to get a gap. With one lap to go, Schwantz’ Suzuki dies, and Rainey cruises to the win, followed by Lawson and Christian Sarron.

500 cc classification

References

Dutch TT
Dutch
Tourist Trophy